John Michael Flagerman (March 27, 1922 – June 12, 2005) was an American football player who played at the center and linebacker positions. He played college football for Saint Mary's (CA) and professional football for the Los Angeles Dons.

Early years
Flagerman was born in 1922 in San Francisco. He attended and played football at Tamalpais High School in Mill Valley, California. While in high school, he set school records in track, basketball, and football.

Military and college football
Flagerman served in the United States Marine Corps during World War II. He served in the Pacific theater of operations and fought in the Guadalcanal and Palau Islands campaigns.

After the war, he played college football for Saint Mary's (CA) in 1946 and 1947.

Professional football
In 1948, he signed with the Los Angeles Dons after James Phelan was hired as the team's head coach.  Phelena had also coached Flagerman at Saint Mary's. He played professional football in the All-America Football Conference for the Los Angeles Dons during their 1948 season.

Family and later years
He died in 2005 at age 83 in Rohnert Park, California.

References

1922 births
2005 deaths
Los Angeles Dons players
Winnipeg Blue Bombers players
BC Lions players
Players of American football from Mississippi
American football centers
United States Marine Corps personnel of World War II
Tamalpais High School alumni